The 2019 West Lancashire Borough Council election took place on 2 May 2019 to elect members of West Lancashire Borough Council.

Results summary

Ward results

OWL = Our West Lancashire

Ashurst

Aughton & Downholland

Aughton Park

Bickerstaffe

Birch Green

Derby

Digmoor

Knowsley

North Meols

Parbold

Scarisbrick

Scott

Skelmersdale North

Skelmersdale South

Tanhouse

Tarleton

Up Holland

Wrightington

References

2019 English local elections
2019
2010s in Lancashire